The Khartoum International is a defunct tennis tournament that was played on the Grand Prix tennis circuit in 1976. The event was held in Khartoum, Sudan and was played on outdoor hard courts.  Mike Estep won the singles title, defeating Thomaz Koch in the final.

Singles

References
 Singles Draw

External links

Defunct tennis tournaments in Africa
Grand Prix tennis circuit
Hard court tennis tournaments
Defunct sports competitions in Sudan